Maryam Butt (born 26 April 1985) is a Pakistani former cricketer who played primarily as a left-arm medium bowler. She appeared in one Test match and 12 One Day Internationals for Pakistan between 2003 and 2006. She played domestic cricket for Lahore and Pakistan Universities.

References

External links
 
 

1985 births
Living people
Cricketers from Lahore
Pakistani women cricketers
Pakistan women Test cricketers
Pakistan women One Day International cricketers
Lahore women cricketers
Pakistan Universities women cricketers